{{Infobox drug
| drug_name         = 
| INN               = 
| type              = 
| image             = Cabozantinib.svg
| alt               = 
| caption           =

| pronounce         = 
| tradename         = Cometriq, Cabometyx, others
| Drugs.com         = 
| MedlinePlus       = a613015
| licence_EU = yes
| DailyMedID        = Cabozantinib
| licence_US        = Cabozantinib
| pregnancy_AU      = D
| pregnancy_AU_comment = 
| pregnancy_category= 
| routes_of_administration = By mouth
| class             = 
| ATC_prefix        = L01
| ATC_suffix        = EX07
| ATC_supplemental  =

| legal_AU = S4
| legal_AU_comment  = 
| legal_BR          = 
| legal_BR_comment  = 
| legal_CA = Rx-only
| legal_CA_comment = 
| legal_DE          = 
| legal_DE_comment  = 
| legal_NZ          = 
| legal_NZ_comment  = 
| legal_UK = POM
| legal_UK_comment = 
| legal_US = Rx-only
| legal_US_comment = 
| legal_EU = Rx-only
| legal_EU_comment = 
| legal_UN          = 
| legal_UN_comment  = 
| legal_status      = 

| bioavailability   = 
| protein_bound     = ≥99.7%
| metabolism        = Liver (CYP3A4-mediated)
| metabolites       = 
| onset             = 
| elimination_half-life = 110 hours
| duration_of_action = 
| excretion         = Feces (54%), urine (27%)

| index2_label = as salt
| CAS_number        = 849217-68-1
| CAS_supplemental  = 
| PubChem           = 25102847
| IUPHAR_ligand     = 
| DrugBank          = DB08875
| ChemSpiderID      = 25948202
| UNII              = 1C39JW444G
| KEGG              = D10062
| KEGG2             = D10095
| ChEBI_Ref = 
| ChEBI = 72317
| ChEMBL = 2105717
| NIAID_ChemDB      = 
| PDB_ligand        = 
| synonyms          = XL184, BMS907351

| IUPAC_name        = N-(4-((6,7-Dimethoxyquinolin-4-yl)oxy)phenyl)-''N-(4-fluorophenyl)cyclopropane-1,1-dicarboxamide
| C=28 | H=24 | F=1 | N=3 | O=5
| SMILES            = COc1cc2nccc(Oc3ccc(NC(=O)C4(C(=O)Nc5ccc(F)cc5)CC4)cc3)c2cc1OC
| StdInChI = 1S/C28H24FN3O5/c1-35-24-15-21-22(16-25(24)36-2)30-14-11-23(21)37-20-9-7-19(8-10-20)32-27(34)28(12-13-28)26(33)31-18-5-3-17(29)4-6-18/h3-11,14-16H,12-13H2,1-2H3,(H,31,33)(H,32,34)
| StdInChI_comment  = 
| StdInChIKey = ONIQOQHATWINJY-UHFFFAOYSA-N
| density           = 
| density_notes     = 
| melting_point     = 
| melting_high      = 
| melting_notes     = 
| boiling_point     = 
| boiling_notes     = 
| solubility        = 
| sol_units         = 
| specific_rotation = 
}}Cabozantinib, sold under the brand names Cometriq and Cabometyx''' among others, is a medication used to treat medullary thyroid cancer, renal cell carcinoma, and hepatocellular carcinoma. It is a small molecule inhibitor of the tyrosine kinases c-Met and VEGFR2, and also inhibits AXL and RET.  It was discovered and developed by Exelixis Inc.

In November 2012, cabozantinib in its capsule formulation was approved by the U.S. Food and Drug Administration (FDA) under the name Cometriq for treating patients with medullary thyroid cancer. The capsule form was approved in the European Union for the same purpose in 2014.

In April 2016, the FDA granted approval for marketing the tablet formulation (Cabometyx) as a second line treatment for kidney cancer and the same was approved in the European Union in September of that year.

The brands Cometriq and Cabometyx have different formulations and are not interchangeable.

Medical uses
Cabozantinib is used in two forms.  A capsule form (Cometriq) is used since 2012, to treat medullary thyroid cancer and a tablet form (Cabometyx) is used since 2016, as a second line treatment for renal cell carcinoma.

In the United States, cabozantinib (Cabometyx) is also indicated for the treatment of people aged twelve years of age and older with locally advanced or metastatic differentiated thyroid cancer (DTC) that has progressed following prior VEGFR-targeted therapy and who are ineligible or refractory to radioactive iodine.

Contraindications
Cabozantinib has not been tested in pregnant women; it causes harm to fetuses in rodents.  Pregnant women should not take this drug, and women should not become pregnant while taking it.  It is not known if cabozantinib is excreted in breast milk.

The drug should be used with caution in people with a history of  heart rhythm problems, including long QT interval.

Adverse effects
In the US, the capsule formulation (Cometriq) carries a black box warning of the risk of holes forming in the stomach or intestines as well as formation of fistulas (tunnels between the GI tract and the skin).  The black box also warns against the risk of uncontrolled bleeding. The tablet formulation (Cabometyx) warns of these effects as well.

The labels also warn of the risk of clots forming and causing heart attacks or strokes, high blood pressure including hypertensive crisis, osteonecrosis of the jaw, severe diarrhea, skin sloughing off the palms and soles, a syndrome with headaches, confusion, loss of vision, and seizures, and protein appearing in urine.

Very common adverse effects (greater than 10% of people) include decreased appetite; low calcium, potassium, phosphate, and magnesium levels; high bilirubin levels; distorted sense of taste, headache, and dizziness; high blood pressure; distorted sense of hearing, earaches and sore throat; diarrhea, nausea, constipation, vomiting, stomach pain and upset stomach, and inflammation of the mouth and lips and a burning sensation in the mouth; skin sloughing off the palms and soles, hair color changes and hair loss, rash, dry skin, and red skin; joint pain and muscle spasms; fatigue and weakness; weight loss, elevated transaminases, higher cholesterol levels, and loss of red and white blood cells.

Common adverse effects (between 1% and 10% of people) include abscesses (inside the body, on the skin, and in teeth skin), pneumonia, inflamed hair follicles, fungal infections, low thyroid levels, dehydration, loss of albumin, anxiety, depression, and confusion, peripheral neuropathy, tingling, and tremor, tinnitus, atrial fibrillation, low blood pressure, blocked veins, paleness, chills, fistulas forming in the trachea and esophagus, blood clots in the lungs, and bleeding in the respiratory tract, GI perforation, bleeding in the stomach and intestines, pancreatitis, hemorrhoids, anal fissure, anal inflammation, gallstones, hard skin growths, acne, blisters, abnormal hair growth, loss of skin color and skin flaking, chest pain, blood or protein in urine, wounds that don't heal well, and facial swelling.

Interactions 

Grapefruit and grapefruit juice should be avoided as they may increase the concentration of the drug in the blood.

Cabozantinib is a substrate of CYP3A4 and multidrug resistance-associated protein 2; drugs that inhibit these enzymes will increase the half-life of cabozantinib and potentially increase its adverse effects; drugs that activate them may cause cabozantinib to be less effective.

It inhibits P-glycoprotein, so will change the availability of other drugs that depend on this transporter.

Pharmacology
It inhibits the following receptor tyrosine kinases: MET (hepatocyte growth factor receptor protein) and VEGFR, RET, GAS6 receptor (AXL), KIT), and Fms-like tyrosine kinase-3 (FLT3).

History
Cabozantinib was granted orphan drug status by the U.S. Food and Drug Administration (FDA) in November 2010, and in February 2017.

Exelixis filed a new drug application with the FDA in the first half of 2012, and on November 29, 2012, cabozantinib in its capsule formulation was granted marketing approval by the U.S. FDA under the name Cometriq for treating patients with medullary thyroid cancer. The capsule form was approved in the European Union for the same purpose in 2014.

In March 2016 Exelixis licensed to Ipsen worldwide rights (outside the US, Canada, and Japan) to market cabozantinib.

Exelixis' Phase III trial results of testing the drug in renal cancer published in the NEJM in 2015. 
In April 2016 the FDA granted approval for marketing the tablet formulation as a second line treatment for kidney cancer and the same was approved in the European Union in September of that year.

In December 2017, the FDA granted approval to cabozantinib (Cabometyx, Exelixis, Inc.) for treatment of people with advanced renal cell carcinoma (RCC). The approval was based on data from CABOSUN (NCT01835158), a randomized, open-label phase II multicenter study in 157 participants with intermediate and poor-risk previously untreated RCC.

In January 2019, the FDA approved cabozantinib (Cabometyx, Exelixis, Inc.) for people with hepatocellular carcinoma (HCC) who have been previously treated with sorafenib. The approval was based on CELESTIAL (NCT01908426), a randomized (2:1), double-blind, placebo-controlled, multicenter trial in participants with HCC who had previously received sorafenib and had Child Pugh Class A liver impairment.

Research 
Cabozantinib is being researched for efficacy as a treatment for renal cell carcinoma (RCC), hepatocellular carcinoma (HCC), cervical cancer, colorectal cancer (CRC), urothelial cancer, prostate cancer, gastric and gastroesophageal cancer, bladder cancer, melanoma, merkel cell carcinoma, brain cancers (including glioblastoma multiforme and anaplastic astrocytoma), non-small cell lung cancer (NSCLC), adrenocortical carcinoma, various sarcomas, head and neck squamous cell carcinomas (HNSCC), breast cancer, endometrial cancer, neuroendocrine cancers, and neurofibromatosis type 1.

References

External links 
 
 
 
 
 
 
 

Antineoplastic drugs
Breakthrough therapy
Cyclopropanes
Fluoroarenes
Orphan drugs
Quinolines
Tyrosine kinase inhibitors
Diaryl ethers